Kenduapada railway station is a railway station on the East Coast Railway network in the state of Odisha, India. It serves Kenduapada village. Its code is KED. It has four platforms. Passenger, MEMU, Express trains halt at Kenduapada railway station.

Major trains

 East Coast Express

See also
 Bhadrak district

References

Railway stations in Bhadrak district
Khurda Road railway division